Dyspessa cyprica is a species of moth of the family Cossidae. It is found in Azerbaijan and on Cyprus.

References

Moths described in 1927
Dyspessa
Moths of Asia
Moths of Europe